Suciwati (born 28 March 1968) is an Indonesian human rights activist who continues the activities of her late husband, Munir Said Thalib, the Right Livelihood Award-winning human rights activist after he was murdered on board of a Garuda Indonesia flight, when he was about to undertake his International Law studies in Utrecht. She is also the founder of the Indonesian museum Omah Munir, founded in 2013, and the campaign titled "Menolak Lupa" or "Refuse to Forget", which is intended to persuade people not to forgot what her husband, Munir, has done for Indonesia.

External links 
 http://omahmunir.com/
 http://content.time.com/time/world/article/0,8599,2054662,00.html
 http://www.humanrightsfirst.org/event/2006-human-rights-award
 http://poty.sindonews.com/view/47/8/suciwati-istri-pejuang-hak-asasi-manusia-munir (in Indonesian)
 https://katakamidotcom.wordpress.com/news/munir-cahaya/ (in Indonesian)

1968 births
Living people
Indonesian human rights activists